Sorokin is a rural locality (a khutor) in Baninsky Selsoviet Rural Settlement, Fatezhsky District, Kursk Oblast, Russia. Population:

Geography 
The khutor is located on the Rzhavets River (a tributary of the Krasavka River in the Svapa River basin), 106 km from the Russia–Ukraine border, 54 km north-west of Kursk, 9 km north of the district center – the town Fatezh, 5.5 km from the selsoviet center – Chermoshnoy.

 Climate
Sorokin has a warm-summer humid continental climate (Dfb in the Köppen climate classification).

Transport 
Sorokin is located on the federal route  Crimea Highway as part of the European route E105, 6 km from the road of regional importance  (Verkhny Lyubazh – Ponyri), 0.5 km from the road of intermunicipal significance  (M2 "Crimea Highway" – Sotnikovo), 29 km from the nearest railway station Vozy (railway line Oryol – Kursk).

The rural locality is situated 55.5 km from Kursk Vostochny Airport, 176 km from Belgorod International Airport and 235 km from Voronezh Peter the Great Airport.

References

Notes

Sources

Rural localities in Fatezhsky District